A shield-maiden was a female warrior from Scandinavian folklore and mythology. 

Shield-maidens are often mentioned in sagas such as Hervarar saga ok Heiðreks and in Gesta Danorum. They also appear in stories of other Germanic peoples: Goths, Cimbri, and Marcomanni. The mythical Valkyries may have been based on such shield-maidens.

Historical existence

The historical existence of shield-maidens has been debated. The most recent scholarship, including that of archaeologist Neil Price, argues that they existed. Some scholars, such as professor Judith Jesch, have cited a lack of evidence for trained or regular female warriors.

Archaeology
Graves of female settlers containing weapons have been uncovered, but scholars do not agree how these should be interpreted. Norse immigrant graves in England and chemical analysis of the remains suggested a somewhat equal distribution of men and women, suggesting husbands took wives, while some of the women were under the burial. In a tie-in special to the TV series Vikings, Neil Price showed that a 10th-century Birka-burial excavated in the 1870s containing many weapons and the bones of two horses turned out to be the grave of a woman upon bone analysis by Anna Kjellström. In 2017, DNA analysis confirmed that the person was female, the so-called Birka female Viking warrior.

Historical accounts
There are historical attestations that Viking Age women took part in warfare. The Byzantine historian John Skylitzes records that women fought in battle when Sviatoslav I of Kiev attacked the Byzantines in Bulgaria in 971. When the Varangians (not to be confused with the Byzantine Varangian Guard) had suffered a devastating defeat in the Siege of Dorostolon, the victors were stunned to discover armed women among the fallen warriors.

When Leif Erikson's pregnant half-sister Freydís Eiríksdóttir was in Vinland, she is reported to have taken up a sword and, bare-breasted, scared away the attacking Skrælings. The fight is recounted in the Greenland saga, which does not explicitly refer to Freydís as a shield-maiden.

Saxo Grammaticus reported that shield-maidens fought on the side of the Danes at the Battle of Brávellir in the year 750:

Legendary accounts
Examples of shield-maidens mentioned by name in the Norse sagas include Brynhildr in the Vǫlsunga saga, Hervor in Hervarar saga ok Heiðreks, the Brynhildr of the Bósa saga ok Herrauðs, the Swedish princess Thornbjǫrg in Hrólfs saga Gautrekssonar, Princess Hed, Visna, Lagertha and Veborg in Gesta Danorum.

Two shield-maidens appear in certain translations of the Hervarar saga. The first of these Hervors was known to have taken up typically masculine roles early in her childhood and often raided travelers in the woods dressed as a man. Later in her life, she claimed the cursed sword Tyrfing from her father's burial site and became a seafaring raider. She eventually settled and married. Her granddaughter was also named Hervor and commanded forces against attacking Huns. Although the saga remarks on her bravery she is mortally wounded by enemy forces and dies on the battlefield.

Scholars Judith Jesch and Jenny Jochens speculate that shield-maidens' often grim fates or their sudden return to typically female roles is a testament to their role as figures of both male and female fantasy as well as emblematic of the danger of abandoning gender roles.

Brynhildr Buðladóttir and Guðrún Gjúkadóttir

Brynhildr of the Vǫlsunga saga, along with her rival in love, Guðrún Gjúkadóttir, provides an example of how a shield-maiden compares to more conventional aristocratic womanhood in the sagas. Brynhildr is chiefly concerned with honour, much like a male warrior. When she ends up married to Guðrún's brother Gunnarr instead of Sigurðr, the man she intended to marry, Brynhildr speaks a verse comparing the courage of the two men:

Brynhildr is married to Gunnarr and not Sigurðr because of deceit and trickery, including a potion of forgetfulness given to Sigurðr so he forgets his previous relationship with her. Brynhildr is upset not only for the loss of Sigurðr, but also for the dishonesty involved. Similar to her male counterparts, the shield-maiden prefers to do things straightforwardly, without the deception considered stereotypically feminine in much of medieval literature. She enacts her vengeance directly, resulting in the deaths of herself, Sigurðr, and Sigurð's son by Guðrún. By killing the child, she demonstrates an understanding of feud and filial responsibility; if he lived, the boy would grow up to take vengeance on Brynhildr's family.

Guðrún has a similar concern with family ties, but at first does not usually act directly. She is more inclined to incite her male relatives to action than take up arms herself. Guðrún is no shield-maiden, and Brynhildr mocks her for this, saying, "Only ask what is best for you to know. That is suitable for noble women. And it is easy to be satisfied while everything happens according to your desires." In her later marriages, however, she is willing to kill her children, burn down a hall, and send her other sons to avenge the murder of her daughter, Svanhildr. In the world of the sagas, women can be both honorable and remorseless, much like the male heroes. While a shield-maiden does not fill a woman's typical role, her strength of character is found in even the more domestic women in these stories.

In popular culture
Female warriors inspired by the Norse sagas are portrayed in numerous works of historical and fantasy fiction, including prominently in such works as the 2013 TV series Vikings. The show depicts Lagertha (played by Katheryn Winnick) as the greatest shield maiden in the world. In the TV show Beforeigners Alfhildr Enginnsdottir (played by Krista Kosonen) and Urd (played by Ágústa Eva Erlendsdóttir) are shield maidens, who fought alongside Thorir Hund against Olaf II of Norway. Alfhildr later came to modern day Norway through a time hole and now works as a police inspector.

Explaining the inclusion of a female Viking warrior protagonist in the video game Assassin's Creed Valhalla, the game's historical advisor Thierry Noël said, "The archaeological sources are highly debated on that specific issue. But (...) it was part of [the Norse] conception of the world. Sagas and myths from Norse society are full of tough female characters and warriors. It was part of their idea of the world, that women and men are equally formidable in battle". Canonically the game's main character can be a male or female (choice of gender at game start) named Eivor Varinsdottir who is the leader of the Raven Clan alongside their adoptive brother Sigurd Styrbjornsson.

While women warriors are a staple of fantasy fiction, they are not often referred to as shield-maidens. Some who are include Éowyn in J. R. R. Tolkien's The Lord of the Rings and Thorgil in Nancy Farmer's The Sea of Trolls trilogy.

See also
Birka female Viking warrior
Women in ancient warfare
Women in post-classical warfare
Women in warfare (1500–1699)
Women warriors in literature and culture
List of women warriors in folklore
Onna-bugeisha

References

External links

Characters in Norse mythology
Cultural studies
European folklore characters
Fantasy tropes
Feminist theory
Fictional women soldiers and warriors
Germanic legends
Germanic women warriors
Mythological archetypes
Mythological characters
People whose existence is disputed
Scandinavian folklore
Stock characters

War goddesses
Women in early Germanic culture
Women in medieval European warfare
Women in mythology
Women in war in Norway
Women in war in Sweden
Brunhild